Staincliffe and Batley Carr railway station served the hamlet of Staincliffe and the district of Batley Carr in West Yorkshire, England from 1878 to 1952 on the Huddersfield Line.

History 
The station opened on 1 November 1878 by the London and North Western Railway. It closed as a wartime economy measure on 1 January 1917 but reopened on 5 May 1919,only to close again on 7 April 1952.

References

External links 

Disused railway stations in Kirklees
Former London and North Western Railway stations
Railway stations in Great Britain opened in 1878
Railway stations in Great Britain closed in 1952
1878 establishments in England
1952 disestablishments in England